Sanath Rathnayake Weerakoon, is a Sri Lankan former government agent. He served as the government agent  (district secretary) for the District of Colombo (1990–1999), Sri Lanka, and is considered one of the most distinguished and respected officers in the Sri Lankan Administrative Service. He served as the government agent of Colombo for 10 years under two different governments and is a feat that has not yet been broken. Weerakoon was also the youngest appointed government agent, to the District of Puttalam in 1978. The government agent is the administrative had of public services in the district. The post is one of the oldest in the civil service as it had been established by the British during the colonial era. Weerakoon is the current add. private secretary to the president of Sri Lanka.

Education
Weerakoon was educated at Weerakatiya Central School, where he passed the S.S.C (Senior School Certificate) in English Medium 1st Shy. Weerakoon was the only student to do so in Hambantota District in 1956.

In 1957, Weerakoon entered the Tellijawila Central College, where he successfully completed the H.S.C. (Higher School Certificate). He was ranked 40th from the country and entered the University of Ceylon in 1959.

At the age of 22, he graduated from the University of Ceylon with Honours in geography and was appointed as a graduate teacher in the same year. Later at the age of 25, Weerakoon was promoted as the principal of Tangalle Maha Vidyalaya.

Weerakoon completed his postgraduate studies at The Hague University in Netherlands, the University of Hawaii in United States and at the United Nations Asia and Far East Institute (UNAFEI) in Japan.

Sri Lanka Administrative Service
Weerakoon passed the Ceylon Civil Service entrance exam in 1967, when 30,000 graduates sat this tough exam and only 70 were successful in passing. In the 1970s the Ceylon Civil Service was abolished and replaced with the Sri Lanka Administrative Service. Weerakoon after 10 years of service in the SLAS, became a Class 1 SLAS Officer.

Weerakoon has since held number of senior positions in the SLAS and notably the below:
 1978–1982 government agent for Puttalam District
 1982–1982 commissioner general of the Department of Probation and Child Care Services
 1982–1986 director general of the Sri Lanka School of Social Work
 1986–1987 additional secretary to the Ministry of Security for Commercial & Industrial Establishments
 1990–1999 government agent for Colombo District 
 1990–1999 additional secretary to the Cabinet Ministry of Public Administration and Home Affairs
 1999–2000 permanent secretary to the Cabinet Ministry of Plantation Industries

Weerakoon has been a consultant, an advisor and chairman to a number of private-sector firms, corporations, boards and commissions, some of which are as follows:
 chairman of the Urban Development Authority of Sri Lanka
 chairman of the Environmental Council of Sri Lanka
 chairman of the Vocational Council of Sri Lanka
 chairman of the Fair Trading Commission
 consultant to the Human Rights Commission of Sri Lanka

Family
Sanath is the eldest son from 8 siblings who were born to Don Johannes Rathnayake Weerakoon and Dona Rosalind Moonesinghe.

Sanath's Grandparents were Don Nicholas Rathnayake Weerakoon & Dona Abeysekeara Pathiranalage Gimara.

Sanath Weerakoon married Asoka Palihena in 1972 and they have three children: Thushani, Dushan and Janake.

External links 
 The 6th International Workshop for ECO ASIA Long-term Perspective Project 
 The 7th International Workshop for ECO ASIA Long-term Perspective Project 
 Ceylon Ceramics CorporationChairman’s Report – 2002
 Colombo Plan International Society Office Bearers – 2008/2009
 100,000 displaced says G.A Colombo
 Colombo Plan International Society Office Bearers – 2009
 Sanath Weerakoon, a Brilliant Administrator says Minister Ratnasiri Wickremanayake
 Red Cross Probe headed by GA Colombo
 Communicating with Policymakers about Population and Health Conference
 Sanath Weerakoon Appointed as Chairman of the UDA - The Island 27 Dec 2008
 New UDA Chairman - Daily News 29 Dec 2008
 Golf at Waters Edge was good? Now they are telling us
 UDA Chairman's Profile
 Government Information Centre
 Ministry of Urban Development Contacts
 UDA at battle - Sunday Leader
 Accelerated program to develop Sri Lanka's capital Colombo
 Development plan for the Municipal council of Galle
 Cashew Corporation Chairman falls from Cashew Tree
 Best Cashew in the World is in Sri Lanka
 Sri Lanka Cashew Corporation earning profits under new Chairman
 A New lease of life for Cashew Industry
 President Discusses Nagamu Purawara With Government Officials
 Accelerated program to develop Sri Lanka's capital Colombo

Living people
Sri Lankan Buddhists
Alumni of the University of Ceylon
University of Hawaiʻi alumni
1941 births
Sinhalese civil servants
The Hague University of Applied Sciences alumni